Nickelodeon Land is a themed children's area at the Sea World theme park on the Gold Coast, Australia. The area currently features 6 operating rides as well as some other attractions.

History
In 1981, Sea World opened the Carousel. Prior to October 1999, Sea World the area where Beach Break Bay currently stands was part of the Sea World Lake. The land was filled in for the construction of Cartoon Network Cartoon Beach which opened in October 1999. This saw the introduction of several rides including Air-See Rescue, Airborne Barrel Brigade, Dexter's Time Machine, Toon Point Lighthouse and Woody's Beachtrucks. In 2007, work began on the removal of the Cartoon Network theme. On 29 September 2007, Sesame Street Beach officially opened replacing Cartoon Network Cartoon Beach. This saw the introduction of a new ride, an SBF Visa Group Happy Tower named Big Bird Bounce as well as a show stage adjacent to the area. The stage was used for Bert and Ernie's Island Holiday. In late 2011, Sesame Street Beach was converted into the generic Beach Break Bay theme. The show stage now shows Dora's Best Friends Adventure.

In April 2015, Sea World announced it was going to refurbish Beach Break Bay, and add four new rides. A Zamperla roller coaster is rumoured as one of the additions. Eventually those plans were scrapped and replaced with plans for a Nickelodeon area. The new rides will still be added however. Nickelodeon Land opened in September 2015.

Rides

Gallery

See also
 Kids WB Fun Zone

References

External links
 

Amusement rides introduced in 1999
Amusement rides that closed in 2007
Amusement rides introduced in 2007
Amusement rides that closed in 2011
Amusement rides introduced in 2011
1999 establishments in Australia